Soft coal may refer to several lower quality types of coal, primarily used for power generation:

Lignite, or brown coal
Sub-bituminous coal
Bituminous coal, or black coal